Isparta is a city in western Turkey and the capital of Isparta Province. The city's population was 222,556 in 2010 and its elevation is 1035 m. It is known as the "City of Roses".

Isparta is well-connected to other parts of Turkey via roads. Antalya lies 130 km to the south and Eskişehir is 350 km to the north.

Süleyman Demirel University has introduced thousands of youths from varied backgrounds to the city's mostly conservative fabric in recent years. The city's football team, Ispartaspor, plays in Group 7 of the Turkish Regional Amateur League.

History

Roman era
Isparta is a Turkish spelling of Greek Sparta, by prothesis declustering.

Isparta was said to correspond to the ancient city of Baris, which is a namesake and was part of the Roman province of Pisidia. A later theory has it instead as the Eastern Roman fortress Saporda; in Muslim sources it appears as Sabarta. GE Bean characterized the situation thus: "These perpetually shifting conceptions leave the reader quite bewildered." Modern scholars locate Baris near Kılıç, in Keçiborlu district, Isparta province.

At an early stage it became a Christian bishopric, a suffragan of the Metropolitan see of Antioch of Pisidia, the capital of the province. The names of two of its bishops are known with certainty: Heraclius participated in the First Council of Nicaea in 325 and Leo in the Second Council of Nicaea in 787. In addition, Paulus was at the Council of Constantinople (869) and Stephanus was at the Council of Constantinople (879), but one or both of these may have been of the Baris in the Roman province of Hellespontus. Like most sees in Asia Minor, it faded away.

1071: Conquered by the Seljuk Turks.
Late 13th century: Becomes part of the Hamidids.
1381: Isparta is sold to the Ottoman sultan Murad I by the Hamidid Emir.
Late 19th century: Muslim refugees from the Balkans settle around Isparta. The Bulgarian refugees brought the knowledge of kazanlik rosewater production with them, leading to Isparta's nickname: city of roses.
1914: According to the 1914 Ottoman population statistics, the district of Isparta had a total population of 54.465, consisting of 46.698 Muslims, 6.648 Greeks and 1.119 Armenians.
1923: The Greek inhabitants of the area were forced to move to Greece under the Greco-Turkish population exchange.

Notable flight crashes

On 19 September, 1976, Turkish Airlines Flight 452, a Boeing 727 aircraft, crashed on a Isparta hill, also Mount Karatepe, killing all 154 occupants.

On November 30, 2007, Atlasjet Flight 4203 crashed on approach to Isparta Süleyman Demirel Airport, killing all 57 passengers and crew.

Titular see 
No longer a residential bishopric, 'Baris in Pisidia' is today listed by the Catholic Church as a titular bishopric, nominal suffragan of Nicomedia, since the diocese was nominally restored in 1933: Latin adjective Baren(us) in Pisidia (Latin). It has been vacant for decades, having had the following incumbents, so far of the fitting Episcopal (lowest) rank:
 Alfred Bertram Leverman (1948.04.24 – 1953.07.27) as Auxiliary Bishop of Halifax (Canada) (1948.04.24 – 1953.07.27); later Bishop of Saint John, New Brunswick (Canada) (1953.07.27 – 1968.09.07), emeritate as Titular Bishop of Altava (1968.09.07 – death 1972.04.28)
 José de Almeida Batista Pereira (1953.12.22 – 1955.11.07) as Auxiliary Bishop of Niterói (Brazil) (1953.12.22 – 1955.11.07), Bishop of Sete Lagoas (Brazil) (1955.11.07 – 1964.04.02), Bishop of Guaxupé (Brazil) (1964.04.02 – retired 1976.01.16); died 2009
 António Cardoso Cunha (1956.03.09 – 1967.01.10), first as Auxiliary Bishop of Beja (Portugal) (1956.03.09 – 1965), then as Coadjutor Bishop of Vila Real (Portugal) (1965 – 1967.01.10), next succeeded as Bishop of Vila Real (1967.01.10 – retired 1991.01.19), died 2004.

Economy 

The main economic activities of Isparta are the production of rosewater and handmade carpets. Tourism, both local and increasingly international due to "biblical tourism", is becoming an important source of revenue.

In the early 20th century, carpetmaking was a major industry in Isparta.

Climate 
Isparta has a Hot-summer mediterranean climate (Köppen climate classification: Csa), or a temperate oceanic climate (Trewartha climate classification: Do). Winters are chilly, rainy and often snowy, summers are hot and dry. The lakes around the city have an important moderating influence on the climate. Precipitation occurs mostly in the winter months, with a notable decrease in summer.

Sights 
The city lies close to a fault line and is thus prone to violent earthquakes.
Most of the ancient city was destroyed by an earthquake 1914. So there are only a few historical buildings left. The oldest building is the Kutlu Bey Mosque (or Ulu Camii, which means great Mosque), built in 1429 by Kutlu Bey, a general of Sultan Murad II. It was very badly destroyed by the earthquake 1914, but restored 1922.
Famous is the Firdevs-Bey-Camii (Mosque) (also: Firdevs Paşa Camii, Mimar Sinan Camii) from 1561. The mosque and the neighboring Bedesten (market hall) are attributed to the architect Sinan. Badly damaged by earthquake in 1914, it was renovated afterwards.

Most of the churches have been destroyed, only a few remain, especially the Aya Payana Church (Turkish: Aya Baniya Kilisesi); a Greek-Orthodox church from 1750. In a state of ruin since 1923, the roof was re-covered in 1999. Another renovation is planned but has not yet been carried out (as of 2022)  

 

The city also has a museum.

Other sights include:

Notable people
Zeki Demirkubuz, film director, screenwriter, producer and film editor
Süleyman Demirel, former prime minister and president of Turkey, was born in the village of Islamköy close to Isparta
Said Nursî, Islamic thinker who spent the last decade of his life in this city
Herman Braun-Vega, Peruvian painter, was appointed Doctor honoris causa of Süleyman Demirel University in 2009.
Mustafa Doğan, footballer
Hussein Avni Pasha, Ottoman Grand Vizier
Halil Hamid Pasha, Ottoman Grand Vizier

Twin towns – sister cities

Isparta is twinned with:
 Comrat, Moldova
 Hamadan, Iran

See also 
 Anatolian Tigers
 Borani

References

Sources and external links 

 Hunt for clues in Turkish crash
 Isparta City Portal – All about Isparta
 GCatholic – (titular) bishopric
 Isparta Son Dakika

 
Ancient Greek archaeological sites in Turkey
Populated places in Isparta Province
Districts of Isparta Province
Pisidia